Denis (or Dennis) Barry (or Barrie) may refer to:

 Denis Barry (1929–2003) president of the United States Chess Federation from 1993 to 1996
 Dennis Barrie (born 1947), American museum director
 Denis "Denny" Barry (1883–1923) Irish republican leader
 Denis "Dinny" Barry-Murphy (1903–1973) Irish hurler from Cork

See also
 Denis Barré (born 1948), Canadian sprint canoer